Ranchi Road railway station is a compact railway station in Ramgarh district, Jharkhand. Its code is RRME. It serves Ramgarh township area as well as other areas of the Ramgarh district. The station consists of two platforms. The platforms are well sheltered. It is located on Gomoh–Barkakana branch line.

It is located in the northern side of the Ramgarh city. The name 'Ranchi Road' comes after Ranchi which once connected only by narrow-gauge line and at that time Ranchi Road was the nearest broad-gauge station to the Ranchi.

Trains 

  Shaktipunj Express
  Palamu Express
  Gomoh–Chopan Passenger
  Asansol–Barkakana Passenger
  Gomoh–Barwadih Passenger

See also

References

External links 

 Ranchi road station Map

Dhanbad railway division
Railway stations in Ramgarh district
Railway services introduced in 1927